Jacob Rowan (born 14 January 1990) is a professional rugby union player for Gloucester. He was educated at Bradford Grammar School, and studied Chemistry at the University of Leeds.

Rowan is a former England U18 international and went on tour with the side to Argentina. In 2009 he was initially named in the England U20 squad for the Six Nations Under 20s Championship. He was also captain of the England U20's for the 2009-10 season.

In July 2012 he was named as captain for Yorkshire Carnegie, making him the youngest ever Leeds captain.
His primary position is at openside flanker.

On 22 May 2014, Rowan makes his move to the Aviva Premiership to join Gloucester Rugby from the 2014-15 season.

References

External links
Gloucester Rugby profile

1990 births
Living people
English rugby union players
Leeds Tykes players
Alumni of the University of Leeds
Rugby union players from Keighley
Rugby union flankers